Karl Alexander Alzner (born September 24, 1988) is a Canadian former professional ice hockey defenceman. He played for the Washington Capitals and Montreal Canadiens in the National Hockey League (NHL). Alzner was drafted in the first round, fifth overall, by the Capitals in the 2007 NHL Entry Draft.

A standout in junior with the Calgary Hitmen of the WHL, Alzner won two World Junior Hockey Championship gold medals with Team Canada 2007 and 2008 (as the captain). Alzner was named the Western Hockey League (WHL)'s top player and Canadian Hockey League (CHL)'s top defenceman in 2008. He won back to back Calder Cups and won the Presidents' Trophy in 2016 and 2017 with the Capitals.

Playing career

Junior and Canadian Appearance
As a youth, Alzner played in the 2002 Quebec International Pee-Wee Hockey Tournament with a minor ice hockey team from Burnaby. He later played Junior B as a 14/15 year old for the Richmond Sockeyes in 2003–04, and won the PIJHL league championship, the Cyclone Taylor Cup provincial championship and placed 2nd in the Keystone Cup.

Alzner played four Western Hockey League (WHL) seasons with the Calgary Hitmen as part of a standout junior career. His last year he was Captain Alzner next Hitmen Captain His first game for the Hitmen was for the Christmas Teddy bear toss as an underage 15 year old with 14,000 fans in the Saddledome.   Alzner was on Team Pacific Silver against Team Toews (West) Gold.   He was a Canada national team member winning in 2005 Memorial of Ivan Hlinka and Canada's gold medal-winning team at the 2007 World Junior Hockey Championships as one of only two players who had not been selected in the NHL draft (the other being Sam Gagner). Shortly after returning to Calgary after the World Junior Championships, Alzner headed to Quebec City, Quebec to play in the 2007 Top Prospects Game and Alzner was named Captain of Team White and Sam Gagner was Captain of team Red.

Alzner was an assistant captain in the 2007 Super Series against the Russian junior team, and was named captain of Team Canada for the 2008 World Junior Championships, both of which were won by Canada. Alzner was named the WHL Player of the Year and Defenceman of the Year for the 2007–08 WHL season.  He was also named the top defenceman in the Canadian Hockey League.

In 2013, Alzner was invited to tryout for the Canadian men's national team.

Professional

Washington Capitals
Alzner was assigned to the Hershey Bears of the American Hockey League (AHL) to start 2008–09. He was called up to the Washington Capitals roster on November 26, 2008, making his NHL debut that night against the Atlanta Thrashers. He recorded his first NHL point (an assist) on December 4, 2008, against the New York Islanders. He recorded his first goal the next game on December 6, 2008, on Hockey Night in Canada against Vesa Toskala of the Toronto Maple Leafs. Alzner's reactions to this accomplishment were captured in an audio-journal he was keeping for the Hockey Diaries project. Alzner was sent back down to Hershey on January 28, 2009 to make room for returning defenceman Tom Poti. He was recalled during the Capitals' playoff series with the Pittsburgh Penguins on May 3 as a precautionary measure after injuries to several Washington defencemen, but did not see any action. Alzner won his first Calder Cup Championship 2008–09 with the Hershey Bears against Manitoba.

In his second season with the Capitals in 2009–10, he was called up to the NHL several times by the Capitals.  He played on a defensive pairing with John Carlson in game 7 of the Eastern Conference Quarterfinals vs Montreal. Alzner won his 2nd Calder Cup Championship (2009–10) with the Hershey Bears against the Texas Stars.

On July 15, 2011, Alzner signed a two-year contract with the Washington Capitals. On July 10, 2013, Alzner signed a four-year contract extensions with the Capitals. Alzner was then invited by Hockey Canada for the 2014 Olympic orientation camp on July 22, 2013.

During the 2015–16 season, on January 27, 2016, Alzner became the Washington Capitals all-time leader in consecutive games played. With 423 consecutive games played he passed Bob Carpenter for the franchise record. The streak began at the beginning of the 2010–11 season.

Montreal Canadiens
On July 1, 2017, having left the Capitals as a free agent after nine seasons, Alzner agreed to a five-year, $23.125 million contract with the Montreal Canadiens. Alzner cited his frustrations with the Capitals playoff shortcomings and that "he wanted to win" by signing with the Canadiens. However, in an ironic twist of fate, the Canadiens finished fourth-to-last in the league in Alzner's first season with the club, while the Capitals would go on to win the 2018 Stanley Cup.

On October 3, 2018, with the Canadiens' set to open the 2018–19 season against the rival Toronto Maple Leafs, Alzner was announced as a healthy scratch. With the decision, Alzner's iron man streak, the fourth longest among active players at the time, ended. He had played in every NHL game on his team's schedules since 2010. On November 27, 2018, Alzner was put on waivers by the Montreal Canadiens when their star defenceman Shea Weber was activated from the injury reserve. Alzner was not claimed by any other NHL organisation and was assigned to the Laval Rocket of the American Hockey League.

On February 22, 2020, Alzner was recalled by the Canadiens, playing in his first NHL game since January 2019.

On October 6, Alzner was placed on waivers by the Canadiens for the purpose of buying out the remaining two years on his contract. On October 7, Alzner cleared waivers, making him a free agent.

Personal life
Alzner and his wife Mandy have a daughter and son together.

He is a friend of Canadian singer Michael Bublé, whose hometown is also Burnaby, British Columbia. Bublé wore a Capitals jersey Alzner had given him during a concert in Washington D.C. in 2022.

Career statistics

Regular season and playoffs

International

Awards and honours

References

External links
 

1988 births
Living people
Calgary Hitmen players
Canadian expatriate ice hockey players in the United States
Canadian ice hockey defencemen
Hershey Bears players
Ice hockey people from British Columbia
Laval Rocket players
Montreal Canadiens players
National Hockey League first-round draft picks
Sportspeople from Burnaby
Washington Capitals draft picks
Washington Capitals players